Friedrich Kottler (December 10, 1886 – May 11, 1965) was an Austrian theoretical physicist. He was a Privatdozent before he got a professorship in 1923 at the University of Vienna.

Life
In 1938, after the Anschluss, he lost his professorship due to his Jewish ancestry. With the help of Albert Einstein and Wolfgang Pauli, he immigrated to America from his hometown of Vienna, Austria, settling in Rochester, New York, where he worked at the Eastman Kodak Research Laboratory.
 He died in Rochester, New York in 1965. Besides optics, Kottler's professional pursuits focused on the theory of relativity.

Contributions to relativity
In (1912), he presented a general covariant formulation of Maxwell's equations, based on the absolute differential calculus, which is also valid within Albert Einstein's General Relativity, before that theory was even developed. In relation to this, Einstein & Marcel Grossmann gave credit to Kottler in 1913.
In (1912, 1914a, 1914b, 1916a, 1916b, 1918, 1921) Kottler worked on the description of accelerations and rotations in flat Minkowski space, using four-dimensional Frenet-Serret formulas and the corresponding orthonormal tetrads, and formulated the proper reference frames for worldlines of constant curvatures given by Gustav Herglotz in 1909, in particular for hyperbolic motion (Kottler-Møller metric) and uniform circular motion. In (1916a), he also discussed the conformal spacetime transformations (related to the spherical wave transformation by Harry Bateman and Ebenezer Cunningham in 1909) as an alternative way to introduce accelerated frames.
In (1916b) he criticized the role of the equivalence principle in general relativity, which prompted a reply by Einstein in the same year.
In (1918) he formulated the Kottler metric or Kottler spacetime (which has been described as "the only spherically symmetric solution of the Einstein vacuum field equations with a cosmological constant"), as well as the Kottler-Whittaker metric for a homogeneous gravitational field in flat spacetime.
In (1922a, 1922b) he argued that one can formulate Maxwell's equations and Newton's law of gravitation independently of any metric.
In (1922c) he published the article "Gravitation und Relativitätstheorie" in Band 6 of Klein's encyclopedia.
In (1924a, 1924b) he analyzed the history of special relativity, focusing on the contributions of Augustin-Jean Fresnel, Hendrik Lorentz, Henri Poincaré and Einstein.

Published works 
 1912: Über die Raumzeitlinien der Minkowski'schen Welt, Wiener Sitzungsberichte 2a, 121: 1659–1759. (English Wikisource translation: On the spacetime lines of a Minkowski world)
 1914a: Relativitätsprinzip und beschleunigte Bewegung, Annalen der Physik 349 (13), 701-748
 1914b: Fallende Bezugssysteme vom Standpunkte des Relativitätsprinzips, Annalen der Physik 349 (13), 701-748
 1916a: Beschleunigungsrelative Bewegungen und die konforme Gruppe der Minkowski'schen Welt, Wiener Sitzungsberichte 2a, 125, 899-919
 1916b: Über Einsteins Äquivalenzhypothese und die Gravitation, Annalen der Physik 355 (16), 955-972
 1918: Über die physikalischen Grundlagen der Einsteinschen Relativitätstheorie, Annalen der Physik, 4. Folge, Bd.60, S.401-461
 1921: Rotierende Bezugssysteme in einer Minkowskischen Welt, Physikalische Zeitschrift 22, 274-280 & 480-484
 1922a: Newtonsches Gesetz und Metrik, Wiener Sitzungsberichte 2a, 131: 1-14. (English translation by David Delphenich: Newton's laws and metrics)
 1922b: Maxwellsche Gleichungen und Metrik, Wiener Sitzungsberichte 2a, 131: 119-146 (English translation by David Delphenich: Maxwell’s equations and metrics)
 1922c, Gravitation und Relativitätstheorie, Encyklopädie der mathematischen Wissenschaften mit Einschluss ihrer Anwendungen, 6.2.2, 159-237
 1923, Zur Theorie der Beugung an schwarzen Schirmen (On the theory of diffraction at black screens), Annalen der Physik, 375  (6): 405–56.
 1924a, Considerations de critique historique sur la theorie de la relativite. Partie 1: De Fresnel à Lorentz, Scientia, 36, pp. 231–242 
 1924b, Considerations de critique historique sur la theorie de la relativite. Partie 2: Henri Poincaré et Albert Einstein, Scientia, 36, pp. 301–316

References 

1886 births
1965 deaths
Austrian physicists
Academic staff of the University of Vienna
Austrian emigrants to the United States